An election took place on February 24, 2015, to elect the mayor of Chicago. The election was non-partisan and no candidate received a majority. A runoff election was held between the top two finishers (both Democrats) on April 7, 2015, and resulted in the reelection of incumbent mayor Rahm Emanuel. The elections were concurrent with the 2015 Chicago aldermanic elections.

Emanuel ran for reelection, seeking a second term in office. In the first round, Emanuel received 46% of the vote and Democratic Cook County Commissioner Jesús "Chuy" García received 34%. Because no candidate received a majority, a runoff was held. In the runoff, Emanuel received 56.23% of the vote, winning the election. Garcia received 43.77% of the vote. 2015 was the first time the election advanced to a runoff since mayoral elections became non-partisan in 1999.

Candidates

Ran
 Rahm Emanuel, incumbent mayor
 Robert Fioretti, Chicago City Alderman
 Jesús "Chuy" García, Cook County Commissioner and former state senator
 William "Dock" Walls, community activist, businessman, former aide to Mayor Harold Washington and perennial candidate
 Willie Wilson, medical supply company executive

Write-in candidates
William H. Calloway
Christopher Ware
Mary Vann

Withdrew
 Frederick Collins, Chicago police officer
Amara Enyia, urban affairs consultant and community activist
 William J. Kelly, political activist, columnist and Republican candidate for Illinois Comptroller in 2010 and 2014
 Gerald Sconyers
 Robert Shaw, former Chicago City Alderman and former commissioner of the Cook County Board of Review

Removed
 Fenton Patterson, perennial candidate

Declined
 Leslie Hairston, Chicago City Alderman
 Karen Lewis, president of the Chicago Teachers Union
 Toni Preckwinkle, president of the Cook County Board of Commissioners
 Kwame Raoul, state senator
 Scott Waguespack, Chicago city alderman

General election

Endorsements

Polling

 * Internal poll for the Rahm Emanuel campaign

Results

Results by ward

Runoff

Endorsements

Polling

 * Internal poll for the Rahm Emanuel campaign

Results

Results by ward

See also
 United States elections, 2015
 Chicago aldermanic elections, 2015

References

External links
Third mayoral debate between Emanuel and Garcia, March 31, 2015

2015
Chicago Mayor
Chicago
2010s in Chicago
2015 in Illinois
Rahm Emanuel